Verkhnekaryshevo (Ürge Qarış) is a rural locality (a village) and the administrative centre of Nizhnekaryshevsky Selsoviet, Baltachevsky District, Bashkortostan, Russia. The population was 439 as of 2010. There are 12 streets.

Geography 
Verkhnekaryshevo is located 26 km south of Starobaltachevo (the district's administrative centre) by road. Churtanlykul is the nearest rural locality.

References 

Rural localities in Baltachevsky District